The 1989 NFL draft was the procedure by which National Football League teams selected amateur college football players. It is officially known as the NFL Annual Player Selection Meeting. The draft was held April 23–24, 1989, at the Marriott Marquis in New York City, New York. The league also held a supplemental draft after the regular draft and before the regular season.

Four of the first five players selected in the draft – quarterback Troy Aikman, running back Barry Sanders, linebacker Derrick Thomas, and cornerback Deion Sanders – would be inducted to the Pro Football Hall of Fame. Tackle Tony Mandarich, the only top five pick not inducted, is considered a draft bust.

The 1989 NFL Draft also helped set a major precedent, as Barry Sanders was selected with the third overall pick despite an NFL rule stating that collegiate juniors could not declare for the draft. Since Barry Sanders was selected as a junior, it has become an expectation for top college players to declare for the draft after their junior season; the rule disallowing collegiate juniors in the NFL draft was lifted by the next draft. Sanders, the 1988 Heisman Trophy winner, was allowed to declare early when Oklahoma State was found guilty of numerous major NCAA rule violations and placed on five years' probation in January 1989. 

Another precedent the draft helped set was how players were invited to the actual draft room. First overall Aikman selection was represented by Leigh Steinberg, who went with his client to the draft finding he was the only player there. As years followed, more players began getting invited to the draft.

Player selections

Round one

 The supplemental draft was held on Friday, July 7.

Round two

Round three

Round four

Round five

Round six

Round seven

Round eight

Round nine

Round ten

Round eleven

Round twelve

Hall of Famers
 Barry Sanders, running back from Oklahoma State, taken third overall by Detroit Lions.  1988 Heisman Trophy winner. 
Inducted: Professional Football Hall of Fame class of 2004
 Troy Aikman, quarterback from UCLA, taken first overall by Dallas Cowboys.
Inducted: Professional Football Hall of Fame class of 2006
 Derrick Thomas, linebacker from Alabama, taken fourth overall by Kansas City Chiefs.
Inducted: Professional Football Hall of Fame class of 2009 (posthumous)
 Deion Sanders, cornerback from Florida State, taken fifth overall by Atlanta Falcons.
Inducted: Professional Football Hall of Fame class of 2011
 Steve Atwater, safety from Arkansas, taken twentieth overall by Denver Broncos.
Inducted: Professional Football Hall of Fame class of 2020

Notable undrafted players

Notes

References

External links
 
 
 

National Football League Draft
NFL Draft
Draft
NFL Draft
NFL Draft
American football in New York City
1980s in Manhattan
Sporting events in New York City
Sports in Manhattan